The 2012 Qatar Crown Prince Cup will be the 18th edition of the Qatar Crown Prince Cup and will take place from April 21 to 26. The cup will contested by the top four finishers in 2011–12 Qatar Stars League.

2012 Participants
 Lekhwiya : 2011–12 Qatar Stars League champions
 El Jaish : 2011–12 Qatar Stars League runner-up
 Al Rayyan : 2011–12 Qatar Stars League 3rd place
 Al-Sadd : 2011–12 Qatar Stars League 4th place

Bracket

Match details

Semi-final

Final

References

Qatar Crown Prince Cup
2011–12 in Qatari football